The Northern Lighthouse Board (NLB) is the general lighthouse authority for Scotland and the Isle of Man. It is a non-departmental public body responsible for marine navigation aids around coastal areas.

History

The NLB was formed by Act of Parliament in 1786 as the Commissioners of Northern Light Houses, largely at the urging of the lawyer and politician George Dempster ("Honest George"), to oversee the construction and operation of four Scottish lighthouses: Kinnaird Head, North Ronaldsay, Scalpay and Mull of Kintyre, for which they were empowered to borrow up to £1,200. Until then, the only major lighthouse in Scotland was the coal brazier mounted on the Isle of May in the Firth of Forth, together with some smaller lights in the Firths of the Tay and Clyde. None of the major passages around Scotland, which led through dangerous narrows, were marked.

The commissioners, whose first president was the Lord Provost of Edinburgh, Sir James Hunter-Blair, advertised for building estimates, but there were no takers. They received an offer of help from Ezekiel Walker of King's Lynn, who had developed a parabolic reflector for the Hunstanton Lighthouse, and sent Thomas Smith, who was making his name in street lighting in Edinburgh and had offered help, to England to learn from him. Smith soon returned and instructed an Edinburgh architect to prepare the plans for four lighthouses.

The £1,200 was spent before the first light at Kinnaird Head was finished, and a further Act of Parliament was required which allowed them to receive half their dues before all the lights were finished. By the end of 1787 the first light had been installed. At the Mull of Kintyre everything had to be transported by pack horse from Campbeltown, 12 miles away, but it was lit by October 1788. To get to Scalpay in the Outer Hebrides and North Ronaldsay in the Orkney Isles needed boat trips across rough waters for Smith and Mills, the stonemason, but all the same the job was completed by October 1789, to widespread praise. The dues which had originally been set at two shillings per ton of cargo in the 17th century, were now reduced to one penny per ton.

The Commissioners' most famous engineer was Robert Stevenson, whose sons David, Alan, and Thomas followed their father into the profession. The Stevenson dynasty built the majority of the Northern lights, in some exceptionally challenging locations. Their lights were some of the engineering masterpieces of their time, notably those at Bell Rock, Skerryvore, and Muckle Flugga.

Between 1876 and 2005 the NLB also maintained foghorns at a number of locations. The last (at Skerryvore) was sounded for the last time on 4 October 2005.

Operations

The board is based at its Georgian headquarters building in George Street in the centre of Edinburgh, from where it remotely monitors its network. Technical operations are carried out from a base in Oban, Argyll and Bute, where there are maintenance workshops and facilities for the construction of buoys and beacons. The NLB's vessels are also based here. The Oban depot has been recently modernised.

Under the terms of the Scotland Act 1998, the NLB is not a devolved body and thus remains directly accountable to the UK Secretary of State for Transport. In practice, there is close co-operation with both the Scottish Government and the Isle of Man Government. The NLB is funded by pooled light dues administered by the UK's Department for Transport, and distributed to the NLB, Trinity House, and the Commissioners of Irish Lights.

Assets

As of 31 March 2019, the NLB operates the following:

Navigational devices 
 Statutory
 206 lighthouses, sub-divided as:
 65 with a range of over 15 nautical miles 
 141 with a range of under 15 nautical miles 
 170 buoys
 25 unlit beacons
 4 DGPS stations (and monitoring an additional 2 stations)
 29 radar beacons, sub-divided as:
 22 on lighthouses
 9 on buoys
 47 Automatic identification system units, sub-divided as
 26 on lighthouses (and monitoring an additional 1 unit)
 20 on buoys
 3 Virtual AIS unit

 Contract
 2 lighthouses (and 2 in Norwegian waters)
 117 buoys
 3 radar beacons (and 2 in Norwegian waters)

 Local Authority
 1117 light stations 
 762 buoy stations

Vessels
This is the tenth Pharos, replacing the ninth Pharos which was sold in September 2006 for use as a Fishery Protection vessel for South Georgia and the South Sandwich Islands.

The commissioners
 
Most of the commissioners have always been ex officio appointments. The original commissioners appointed in 1786 were the Scottish law agents of the Crown, the sheriffs of Scotland's coastal counties, and the provosts and lord provosts of Scottish cities and towns with strong mercantile interests. Reform of local government and sheriffdoms have since resulted in changes. Previous commissioners include Richard Vary Campbell.

The current Commissioners of Northern Lighthouses, as provided by Schedule 8 to the Merchant Shipping Act 1995, are the Lord Advocate and the Solicitor General for Scotland; the lords provost of Edinburgh, Glasgow, and Aberdeen, the conveners of the Highland Council and the Argyll and Bute Council; the sheriffs principal of all the sheriffdoms in Scotland; a Manx representative nominated by the Lieutenant Governor of the Isle of Man and appointed by the Secretary of State; and up to five co-opted commissioners.

Flags

The NLB uses two flags, an ensign and a Commissioners' Flag. The ensign is a Blue Ensign defaced with a white lighthouse in the fly, and is for general use. The Commissioners' flag, a plain White Ensign with a pre-1801 Union Flag in the canton, defaced with a blue lighthouse in the fly, is the only British flag still in use which incorporates the pre-1801 Union Flag. This flag is only flown from vessels with Commissioners aboard.

The Board HQ flies the Commissioners' flag, alongside the Saltire and the Isle of Man flag.

See also
List of Northern Lighthouse Board lighthouses — current operational NLB lighthouses
List of lighthouses in Scotland — includes lighthouses formerly or never owned by the NLB
Commissioners of Irish Lights — responsible for aids to navigation around all of Ireland
Trinity House — responsible for aids to navigation around England, Wales, the Channel Islands and Gibraltar
Richard Henry Brunton, the Scottish "father of Japanese lighthouses"

Notes

References 
 Citations

External links
Northern Lighthouse Board
Lighthouse Library
Pharos 1958 1963 Pharos (archive films about the Northern Lighthouse Board ship ‘Pharos VIII’ - from the National Library of Scotland: Scottish Screen Archive)

Lighthouses in Scotland
Lighthouse organizations
Water transport in Scotland
Transport in the Isle of Man
Non-departmental public bodies of the United Kingdom government
Department for Transport
1786 establishments in Scotland
Organisations based in Edinburgh